Olivia Broome (born 13 June 2001) is a para powerlifter who won a bronze medal in the under-50 kg event at the delayed 2020 Summer Paralympics. She is the British and world junior record holder in the under-50 kg event, and has won multiple Para Powerlifting World Cup medals. She also won the junior under-50 kg event at the 2021 World Para Powerlifting Championships, silver medal in the women's 50 kg event, and a silver medal in the lightweight event at the 2022 Commonwealth Games.

Personal life
Broome is from Chorley, Lancashire. She has been a student at Loughborough University.

Career
Broome started para powerlifting at the age of 15, and trains at the British Weightlifting Centre at Loughborough University.

She came 10th in the under-50 kg event at the 2017 World Para Powerlifting Championships in Mexico City, and second in the junior under-50 kg event. She won a medal at that year's British Championships. She received the 2017 British Weight Lifting Young Lifter of the Year award. At the 2018 European Para Powerlifting Championships, she came third in the senior event, and first in the junior event. In 2019, she received some money from a Westminster charity, in order to help fund her attempts to qualify for the 2020 Summer Paralympics. Broome came third in the 2020 Para Powerlifting World Cup event in Manchester. At the March 2021 Para Powerlifting World Cup event in Manchester, Broome lifted , a new British record. She came second in the event. At the World Cup event in Tbilisi, Broome set a junior world record by lifting . She won the junior event, and finished second in the senior event.

In July 2021, Broome was selected for the under-50 kg event at the delayed 2020 Summer Paralympics. She was one of five Britons selected for para powerlifting events at the Games. At the Games, she finished third in the under-50 kg event, after lifting  on her second attempt.

A few months after the Paralympics, she won the gold medal in the junior women's 50 kg event at the 2021 World Para Powerlifting Championships held in Tbilisi, Georgia. She also won the silver medal in the senior women's 50 kg event. In May 2022, Broome was selected for the para powerlifting event at the 2022 Commonwealth Games. She finished second in the event, behind fellow English competitor Zoe Newson.

References

External links
 

2001 births
Living people
Alumni of Loughborough University
Female powerlifters
Paralympic powerlifters of Great Britain
Powerlifters at the 2020 Summer Paralympics
Medalists at the 2020 Summer Paralympics
Paralympic bronze medalists for Great Britain
Sportspeople from Chorley
Powerlifters at the 2022 Commonwealth Games
Commonwealth Games silver medallists for England
Commonwealth Games medallists in powerlifting
Medallists at the 2022 Commonwealth Games